Nothing to Declare is an studio album by 700 Bliss, an American duo composed of Moor Mother and DJ Haram. Released under Hyperdub on 27 May 2022, the album is 700 Bliss' debut album and comes after their 2018 EP, Spa 700.

Critical reception

On the review aggregator Metacritic, Nothing to Declare received a 83 out of 100 based on 6 published reviews. Nathan Evans wrote for Pitchfork that the album is "anchored" by various instruments and "gristly streaks of noise" and called the almost constant re-pitching of the musicians voices "a hall-of-mirrors twisting of the two musicians’ personalities". Joe Creely of The Skinny wrote that in the latter part of Nothing to Declare it "begins to feel like ideas are being repeated" claiming that the songs in the album "slightly [outstays] its welcome".

Track Listing

References

Hyperdub albums
Moor Mother albums